The Battle of Tsushima (Tsushima oki Kaisen, Tsusimskoye srazheniye), also known as the Battle of Tsushima Strait and the Naval Battle of Sea of Japan (Japanese: 日本海海戦, Nihonkai-Kaisen) in Japan, was a major naval battle fought between Russia and Japan during the Russo-Japanese War. It is the only decisive sea battle ever fought by modern steel battleship fleets and the first naval battle in which wireless telegraphy (radio) played a critically important role. It has been characterized as the "dying echo of the old era – for the last time in the history of naval warfare, ships of the line of a beaten fleet surrendered on the high seas".

The battle was fought on 27–28 May 1905 (14–15 May in the Julian calendar then in use in Russia) in the Tsushima Strait located between Korea and southern Japan. In London in 1906, Sir George Sydenham Clarke wrote, "The battle of Tsu-shima is by far the greatest and the most important naval event since Trafalgar"; decades later, historian Edmund Morris agreed. 

The destruction of the fleet caused a bitter reaction from the Russian public, which induced a peace treaty in September 1905 without any further battles. Conversely, in Japan it was hailed as one of the greatest naval victories in Japanese history, and Admiral Tōgō was revered as a national hero. The battleship Mikasa, from which Tōgō commanded the battle, has been preserved as a museum ship in Yokosuka Harbour.

Prior to the Russo-Japanese War, countries constructed their battleships with mixed batteries of mainly 6-inch (152 mm), 8-inch (203 mm), 10-inch (254 mm) and 12-inch (305 mm) guns, with the intent that these battleships fight on the battle line in a close-quarter, decisive fleet action. The Battle of Tsushima conclusively demonstrated that faster battleships and big guns with longer ranges were superior to batteries of mixed size guns.

Background

Conflict in the Far East
On 8 February 1904, destroyers of the Imperial Japanese Navy launched a surprise attack on the Russian Far East Fleet anchored in Port Arthur; three ships – two battleships and a cruiser – were damaged in the attack. The Russo-Japanese war had thus begun. Japan's first objective was to secure its lines of communication and supply to the Asian mainland, enabling it to conduct a ground war in Manchuria. To achieve this, it was necessary to neutralize Russian naval power in the Far East. At first, the Russian naval forces remained inactive and did not engage the Japanese, who staged unopposed landings in Korea. The Russians were revitalised by the arrival of Admiral Stepan Makarov and were able to achieve some degree of success against the Japanese, but on 13 April Makarov's flagship, the battleship , struck a mine and sank; Makarov was among the dead. His successors failed to challenge the Japanese Navy, and the Russians were effectively bottled up in their base at Port Arthur.

By May, the Japanese had landed forces on the Liaodong Peninsula and in August began the siege of the naval station. On 9 August, Admiral Wilgelm Vitgeft, commander of the 1st Pacific Squadron, was ordered to sortie his fleet to Vladivostok, link up with the Squadron stationed there, and then engage the Imperial Japanese Navy (IJN) in a decisive battle. What remained of Russian Pacific naval power would eventually be sunk in Port Arthur.

Departure
With the inactivity of the First Pacific Squadron after the death of Admiral Makarov and the tightening of the Japanese noose around Port Arthur, the Russians considered sending part of their Baltic Fleet to the Far East. The plan was to relieve Port Arthur by sea, link up with the First Pacific Squadron, overwhelm the Imperial Japanese Navy, and then delay the Japanese advance into Manchuria until Russian reinforcements could arrive via the Trans-Siberian railroad and overwhelm the Japanese land forces in Manchuria. As the situation in the Far East deteriorated, the Tsar (encouraged by his cousin Kaiser Wilhelm II), agreed to the formation of the Second Pacific Squadron. This would consist of five divisions of the Baltic Fleet, including 11 of its 13 battleships. The squadron departed the Baltic ports of Reval (Tallinn) and Libau (Liepāja) on 15–16 October 1904 (Rozhestvensky and von Fölkersahm fleets), and the Black Sea port of Odessa on 3 November 1904 (armored  cruisers Oleg and Izumrud, auxiliary cruisers Rion and Dnieper under the command of Captain Leonid Dobrotvorsky), numbering 42 ships and auxiliaries.

Dogger Bank

The Rozhestvensky and von Fölkersahm fleets sailed through the Baltic into the North Sea. The Russians had heard fictitious reports of Japanese torpedo boats operating in the area and were on high alert. In the Dogger Bank incident, the Russian fleet mistook a group of British fishing trawlers operating near the Dogger Bank at night for hostile Japanese ships. The fleet fired upon the small civilian vessels, killing several British fishermen; one trawler was sunk while another six were damaged. In confusion, the Russians even fired upon two of their own vessels, killing some of their own men. The firing continued for twenty minutes before Rozhestvensky ordered firing to cease; greater loss of life was avoided only because the Russian gunnery was highly inaccurate. The British were outraged by the incident and incredulous that the Russians could mistake a group of fishing trawlers for Japanese warships, thousands of kilometres from the nearest Japanese port. Britain almost entered the war in support of Japan, with whom it had a mutual defense agreement (but was neutral in the war, as their treaty contained a specific exemption for Japanese actions in China and Korea). The Royal Navy sortied and shadowed the Russian fleet while a diplomatic agreement was reached. France, which had hoped to eventually bring the British and Russians together in an anti-German bloc, intervened diplomatically to restrain Britain from declaring war. The Russians were forced to accept responsibility for the incident, compensate the fishermen, and disembark officers who were suspected of misconduct to give evidence to an enquiry.

Routes

Concerns that the draught of the newer battleships, which had proven to be considerably greater than designed, would prevent their passage through the Suez Canal caused the fleet to separate after leaving Tangiers on 3 November 1904. The newer battleships and a few cruisers proceeded around the Cape of Good Hope under command of Admiral Rozhestvensky while the older battleships and lighter cruisers made their way through the Suez Canal under the command of Admiral von Fölkersahm. They planned to rendezvous in Madagascar, and both sections of the fleet successfully completed this part of the journey. The longer journey around Africa took a toll on the Russian crews under Rozhestvensky, "who had never experienced such a different climate or such a long time at sea" as "conditions on the ships deteriorated, and disease and respiratory issues killed a number of sailors". The voyage took half a year in rough seas, with difficulty obtaining coal for refueling – as the warships could not legally enter the ports of neutral nations – and the morale of the crews plummeted. The Russians needed  of coal and 30 to 40 re-coaling sessions to reach French Indochina (now Vietnam), and coal was provided by 60 colliers from the Hamburg-Amerika Line. By April and May 1905 the reunited fleet had anchored at Cam Ranh Bay in French Indochina.

The Russians had been ordered to break the blockade of Port Arthur, but the battleships in the port were sunk by the Japanese army land artillery, and the heavily fortified city/port had already fallen on 2 January just after the Second Pacific Squadron arrived in Nossi Be, Madagascar, before the arrival of the Fölkersahm detachment. The objective was therefore shifted to linking up with the remaining Russian ships stationed in the port of Vladivostok, before bringing the Japanese fleet to battle.

Prelude

The Russians had three possible routes to enter the Sea of Japan and reach Vladivostok: the longer were the La Pérouse Strait and Tsugaru Strait, on either side of Hokaido. Admiral Rozhestvensky did not reveal his choice even to his subordinates until 25 May, when it became apparent he chose Tsushima by ordering the fleet to head North East after detaching transports Yaroslavl, Vladimir, Kuronia, Voronezh, Livonia and Meteor as well as auxiliary cruisers Rion and Dniepr with the instruction to go to the near-by neutral port of Shanghai.  The Tsushima Strait is the body of water eastward of the Tsushima Island group, located midway between the Japanese island of Kyushu and the Korean Peninsula, the shortest and most direct route from Indochina. The other routes would have required the fleet to sail east around Japan. The Japanese Combined Fleet and the Russian Second and Third Pacific Squadrons, sent from the Baltic Sea now numbering 38, would fight in the straits between Korea and Japan near the Tsushima Islands.

Because of the  journey, the Russian fleet was in relatively poor condition for battle. Apart from the four newest s, Admiral Nebogatov's 3rd Division consisted of older and poorly maintained warships. Overall neither side had a significant maneuverability advantage. The long voyage, combined with a lack of opportunity for maintenance, meant the Russian ships were heavily fouled, significantly reducing their speed. The Japanese ships could sustain , but the Russian fleet could reach just , and then only in short bursts.

Additionally, there were significant deficiencies in the Russian naval fleet's equipment and training. Russian naval tests with their torpedoes exposed major technological failings. Tōgō's greatest advantage was that of experience, having all of the five fleet commanders in either navy with combat experience aboard modern warships on his side.  The others were all Russian admirals whom he had defeated, including Oskar Starck, who had been relieved of his command following his humiliating defeat in the Battle of Port Arthur; Admiral Stepan Makarov, killed by a mine off Port Arthur; and Wilgelm Vitgeft, who had been killed in the Battle of the Yellow Sea.

Battle

First contact

Because the Russians desired to slip undetected into Vladivostok, as they approached Japanese waters they steered outside regular shipping channels to reduce the chance of detection. On the night of 26 May 1905 the Russian fleet approached the Tsushima Strait.

In the night, thick fog blanketed the straits, giving the Russians an advantage. At 02:45 on 27 May Japan Standard Time (JST), the Japanese auxiliary cruiser Shinano Maru observed three lights on what appeared to be a vessel on the distant horizon and closed to investigate. These lights were from the Russian hospital ship Orel, which, in compliance with the rules of war, had continued to burn them. At 04:30, Shinano Maru approached the vessel, noting that she carried no guns and appeared to be an auxiliary. The Orel mistook the Shinano Maru for another Russian vessel and did not attempt to notify the fleet. Instead, she signaled to inform the Japanese ship that there were other Russian vessels nearby. The Shinano Maru then sighted the shapes of ten other Russian ships in the mist. The Russian fleet had been discovered, and any chance of reaching Vladivostok undetected had disappeared.

Wireless telegraphy played an important role from the start. At 04:55, Captain Narikawa of the Shinano Maru sent a message to Admiral Tōgō in Masampo that the "Enemy is in square 203".  By 05:00, intercepted radio signals informed the Russians that they had been discovered and that Japanese scouting cruisers were shadowing them. Admiral Tōgō received his message at 05:05, and immediately began to prepare his battle fleet for a sortie.

Beginning of the battle
At 06:34, before departing with the Combined Fleet, Admiral Tōgō wired a confident message to the navy minister in Tokyo:

The final sentence of this telegram has become famous in Japanese military history, and has been quoted by former Japanese Prime Minister Shinzō Abe.

At the same time the entire Japanese fleet put to sea, with Tōgō in his flagship Mikasa leading over 40 vessels to meet the Russians. Meanwhile, the shadowing Japanese scouting vessels sent wireless reports every few minutes as to the formation and course of the Russian fleet. There was mist which reduced visibility and the weather was poor. Wireless gave the Japanese an advantage; in his report on the battle, Admiral Tōgō noted the following:

At 13:40, both fleets sighted each other and prepared to engage. At around 13:55, Tōgō ordered the hoisting of the Z flag, issuing a predetermined announcement to the entire fleet:

By 14:45, Tōgō had 'crossed the Russian T' enabling him to fire broadsides, while the Russians could reply only with their forward turrets.

Daylight action

The Russians sailed from south southwest to north northeast; "continuing to a point of intersection which allowed only their bow guns to bear; enabling him [Tōgō] to throw most of the Russian batteries successively out of bearing." The Japanese fleet steamed from northeast to west, then Tōgō ordered the fleet to turn in sequence, which enabled his ships to take the same course as the Russians, although risking each battleship consecutively. Although Tōgō's U-turn was successful, Russian gunnery had proven surprisingly good and the flagship Mikasa was hit 15 times in five minutes.  Before the end of the engagement she was struck 15 more times by large caliber shells. Rozhestvensky had only two alternatives, "a charge direct, in line abreast", or to commence "a formal pitched battle." He chose the latter, and at 14:08, the Japanese flagship Mikasa was hit at about 7,000 metres, with the Japanese replying at 6,400 meters. Superior Japanese gunnery then took its toll, with most of the Russian battleships being crippled.

Commander Vladimir Semenoff, a Russian staff officer aboard the flagship , said "It seemed impossible even to count the number of projectiles striking us. Shells seemed to be pouring upon us incessantly one after another. The steel plates and superstructure on the upper decks were torn to pieces, and the splinters caused many casualties. Iron ladders were crumpled up into rings, guns were literally hurled from their mountings. In addition to this, there was the unusually high temperature and liquid flame of the explosion, which seemed to spread over everything. I actually watched a steel plate catch fire from a burst."

This was the first time a modern armoured warship had been sunk by gunfire alone.

A direct hit on the 's magazines by the Japanese battleship Fuji caused her to explode, which sent smoke thousands of metres into the air and trapped all of her crew on board as she sank. Rozhestvensky was knocked out of action by a shell fragment that struck his skull. In the evening, Rear Admiral Nikolai Nebogatov took over command of the Russian fleet. The Russians lost the battleships Knyaz Suvorov, Oslyabya,  and Borodino. The Japanese ships suffered only light damage.

Night attacks
At night, around 20:00,  21 destroyers and 45 Japanese torpedo boats were thrown against the Russians. The destroyers attacked from the vanguard while the torpedo boats attacked from the east and south of the Russian fleet. The Japanese were aggressive, continuing their attacks for three hours without a break; as a result, during the night there were a number of collisions between the small craft and Russian warships. The Russians were now dispersed in small groups trying to break northwards. By 23:00, it appeared that the Russians had vanished, but they revealed their positions to their pursuers by switching on their searchlights – ironically, the searchlights had been turned on to spot the attackers. The old battleship  struck a chained floating mine laid in front, and was forced to stop in order not to push the chain forward, inviting other floating mines on the chain in on herself.  She was consequently torpedoed four times and sunk. Out of a crew of 622, only three survived, one to be rescued by the Japanese and the other two by a British merchant ship.

The battleship  was badly damaged by a torpedo in the stern, and was scuttled the next day. Two old armoured cruisers –  and  – were badly damaged, the former by a torpedo hit to the bow, the latter by colliding with a Japanese destroyer. They were both scuttled by their crews the next morning off Tsushima Island, where they headed while taking on water. The night attacks placed a great strain on the Russians, as they lost two battleships and two armoured cruisers, while the Japanese lost only three torpedo boats.

XGE signal and Russian surrender
At 05:23 on 28 May, what remained of the Russian fleet was sighted heading northeast. Tōgō's battleships proceeded to surround Nebogatov's remaining squadron south of the island of Takeshima and commenced main battery fire at 12,000 meters. The  then turned South and attempted to flee. Realising that his guns were outranged by at least one thousand metres  and the Japanese battleships had proven on the day before to be faster than his own so that he could not close the distance, Nebogatov ordered the six ships remaining under his command to surrender. XGE, an international signal of surrender, was hoisted; however, the Japanese navy continued to fire as they did not have "surrender" in their code books and had to hastily find one that did. Still under heavy fire, Nebogatov then ordered a white table cloth sent up the masthead, but Tōgō, having had a Chinese warship escape him while flying that flag during the 1894 war, did not trust them.

Moreover, his lieutenants found the codebook that included XGE signal and reported that stopping of engines is a requirement for the signal to mean 'surrender' and all the Russian ships were still moving, so he continued firing while response flag signal "STOP" hoisted. Nebogatov then ordered St. Andrew's Cross lowered and the Japanese national flag raised on the gaff and all engines stopped.  Seeing the Japanese flag raised as the ensign, Tōgō gave the cease fire and accepted Nebogatov's surrender. Nebogatov surrendered knowing that he could be shot for doing so. He said to his men:

As an example of the level of damage inflicted on a Russian battleship,  was hit by five 12-inch, nine 8-inch, 39 six-inch and 21 smaller or unidentified shells. This damage caused her to list, and the engine ceased to operate when she was being taken by the Japanese navy to First Battle Division home port of Sasebo in Nagasaki after Tōgō accepted the surrender.  Battleship  had to tow Oryol, and their destination was changed to the closer Maizuru Naval Arsenal to avoid losing the prize of war.

The wounded Admiral Rozhestvensky went to the Imperial Japanese Naval Hospital in Sasebo to recover from a head injury caused by shrapnel; there, the victorious Admiral Tōgō visited him personally in plain clothes, comforting him with kind words: "Defeat is a common fate of a soldier. There is nothing to be ashamed of in it. The great point is whether we have performed our duty".

Nebogatov and Rozhestvensky were placed on trial on return to Russia. Rozhestvensky claimed full responsibility for the fiasco and was sentenced to death, but as he had been wounded and unconscious during the last part of the battle, the Tsar commuted his death sentence. Nebogatov, who had surrendered the fleet, was imprisoned for several years and eventually pardoned by the Tsar.

Until the evening of 28 May, isolated Russian ships were pursued by the Japanese until almost all were destroyed or captured. Three Russian warships reached Vladivostok. The cruiser , which escaped from the Japanese despite being present at Nebogatov's surrender, was destroyed by her crew after running aground on the Siberian coast.

Contributing factors

Commander and crew experience
Admiral Rozhestvensky faced a more combat-experienced battleship admiral in Tōgō Heihachirō. Admiral Tōgō had already killed two Russian admirals: Stepan Makarov outside of Port Arthur in the battleship Petropavlovsk in April 1904, then Wilgelm Vitgeft in his battleship  in August of the same year. Before those two deaths, Tōgō had chased Admiral Oskar Starck, also flying his flag in the Petropavlovsk, off the battlefield.
Admiral Tōgō and his men had two battleship fleet action experiences, which amounted to over four hours of combat experience in battleship-to-battleship combat at Port Arthur and the Yellow Sea.
The Japanese fleets had practiced gunnery extensively since the beginning of the war, using sub-calibre practice guns  mounted in their larger guns.

In contrast,  underwent sea trials from 23 August to 13 September 1904 as a brand new ship upon her completion, and the new crew did not have much time for training before she set sail for the Pacific on 15 October 1904. Borodinos sister ship,  started trials on 9 August,  started trials the latest on 10 September 1904, leaving  (the trials finished in October 1903) as the only Borodino-class ship actually ready for deployment. As the Imperial Russian Navy planned on building 10 Borodino-class battleships (5 were ultimately built) with the requirement for thousands of additional crewmen, the basic training, quality and experience of the crew and cadets were far lower than those on board the battleships in the seasoned Pacific Fleet.

 
The Imperial Russian Admiralty Council (Адмиралтейств-совет) and the rest of the Admiralty were quite aware of this disadvantage, and opposed the October dispatch plan for the following reasons:
1. The Japanese navy has completed the battle preparations with all the crew having some combat experiences.
2. The long voyage is mostly through extreme tropical weather, so meaningful training is practically impossible on the way.
3. Therefore, the newly created Second Pacific Fleet should conduct training in the Baltic until the next spring while waiting for the rigging of another battleship, and the purchase of Chilean and Argentine warships.

However, at the council in the imperial presence on 23 August 1904 held at the Peterhof Grand Palace, this opinion was overruled by Admiral Rozhestvensky (Commander in Chief of the Fleet), Navy Minister Avellan, and Tsar Nicholas II; for it was deemed impossible to re-arrange the massive coaling for the long voyage if the navy broke the contract that was already signed with Hamburg-American Steamship Line of Germany.

Salvo firing director system

Up to the Battle of the Yellow Sea on 10 August 1904, naval guns were controlled locally by a gunnery officer assigned to that gun or a turret. He specified the elevation and deflection figures, gave the firing order while keeping his eyes on the artificial horizon gauge indicating the rolling and pitching angles of the ship, received the fall of shot observation report from the spotter on the mast, calculated the new elevation and deflection to 'walk' the shots in on the target for the next round, without much means to discern or measure the movements of his own ship and the target.

In the months before the battle, the Chief Gunnery Officer of Asahi, Lieutenant Commander Katō Hiroharu, aided by a Royal Navy advisor who introduced him to the use of the early mechanical computer Dumaresq in fire control, introduced a system for centrally issuing the gun-laying and salvo-firing orders. Using a central system allowed the spotter to identify a salvo of distant shell splashes much more effectively than trying to identify a single splash among the many in the confusion of a fleet-to-fleet combat. Further, the spotter needed to keep track of just one firing at a time as opposed to multiple shots on multiple stopwatches, in addition to having to report to just one officer on the bridge. The 'director' officer on the bridge had the advantage of having a higher vantage point than in the gun turrets, in addition to being steps away from the ship commander giving orders to change the course and the speed in response to the incoming reports on target movements.

This fire control director system was introduced to other ships in the fleet with Katō being promoted to the Chief Gunnery Officer of the fleet flagship Mikasa in March 1905. The training and practice on this system were carried out in the months waiting for the arrival of the Baltic Fleet while its progress was reported by the British intelligence from their naval stations at Gibraltar, Malta, Aden(Yemen), Cape of Good Hope, Trincomalee(Ceylon), Singapore and Hong Kong, among other locations.

Wireless telegraphy
The wireless telegraph (radio) had been invented during the last half of the 1890s, and by the turn of the century nearly all major navies were adopting this improved communications technology. Tsushima was "the first major sea battle in which wireless played any role whatsoever".

Lieutenant Akiyama Saneyuki (who was the key staff to Admiral Tōgō in formulating plans and directives before and during the battle as a Commander, who also went onboard Nikolai I to accept Admiral Nebogatov's surrender as Tōgō's representative) had been sent to the United States as a naval attaché in 1897. He witnessed firsthand the capabilities of radio telegraphy and sent a memo to the Navy Ministry urging that they push ahead as rapidly as possible to acquire the new technology. The ministry became heavily interested in the technology; however it found the Marconi wireless system, which was then operating with the Royal Navy, to be exceedingly expensive. The Japanese therefore decided to create their own radio sets by setting up a radio research committee under Professor Kimura Shunkichi, which eventually produced an acceptable system. Two years later, a laboratory, a factory, and a radio communication school were set up at Yokosuka Naval Arsenal to produce the Type 36 (1903) radios, and these were quickly installed on every major warship in the Combined Fleet by the time the war started.

Alexander Stepanovich Popov of the Naval Warfare Institute had built and demonstrated a wireless telegraphy set in 1900.  However, technology improvement and production in the Russian empire lagged those of Germany, and "System Slaby-Arco", originally made by D.R.P. Allgemeine Elektricitäts-Gesellschaft (AEG) and then produced in volume by its successor radio maker Telefunken in Germany (by 1904, this system was in wide use by Kaiserliche Marine) was adopted by the Imperial Russian Navy. Although both sides had early wireless telegraphy, the Russians were using German sets tuned and maintained by German technicians half-way into the voyage, while the Japanese had the advantage of using their own equipment maintained and operated by their own navy specialists trained at the Yokosuka school.

British support
The United Kingdom assisted Japan by building battleships for the IJN.  The UK also assisted Japan in intelligence, finance, technology, training and other aspects of the war against Russia. At the time, Britain owned and controlled more harbor facilities around the world –  specifically shipyards and coaling stations – than Russia and its allies (France, and to some extent Germany) combined. The UK also obstructed, where possible, Russian attempts to purchase ships and coal.

At the end of the Argentine-Chilean naval arms race in 1903, two Chilean-ordered and British-built battleships (then called Constitución and Libertad) and two Argentinean-ordered, Italian-built cruisers (then called Bernardino Rivadavia and Mariano Moreno) were offered to Russia and the purchase was about to be finalized. Britain stepped in as the mediator of Pacts of May that ended the race, bought the Chilean battleships (which became  and ), and brokered the sale of Argentinean cruisers to Japan. This support not only limited the growth of the Imperial Russian Navy, but also helped IJN in obtaining the latest Italian-built cruisers (IJN  and ) that played key roles in this battle.

Also, this support created a major logistics problem for around the world deployment of the Baltic Fleet to the Pacific in procuring coal and supplies on the way. At Nosy Be in Madagascar and at Camranh Bay, French Indochina, the fleet was forced to be anchored for about two months each, seriously degrading morale of the crew. By the time it reached the Sea of Japan after crossing the warm waters of the equator twice, the hulls of all the ships in the fleet were heavily fouled in addition to carrying the extra coal otherwise not required on deck.

The Japanese ships, on the other hand, were well maintained in the ample time given by the intelligence.  For example, battleship  was under repair from November 1904 to April 1905 at Sasebo for two 12" guns lost and serious damage to the hull from striking a mine.  They were divided into battle divisions of as much uniform speed and gun range so that a fleet would not suffer a bottleneck in speed, and the range of guns would not render some ships useless within a group in an extended range combat.

High explosive and cordite
The Japanese used mostly high-explosive shells filled with Shimose powder, which was a pure picric acid (as opposed to the French Melinite or the British Lyddite, which were picric acid mixed with collodion (French) or with dinitrobenzene and vaseline (British) for stability). Engineer Shimose Masachika (1860-1911) solved the instability problem of picric acid on contact with iron and other heavy metals by coating the inside of a shell with unpigmented Japanese lacquer and further sealing with wax. Because it was undiluted, Shimose powder had a stronger power in terms of detonation velocity and temperature than other high explosives at the time.  These shells had a sensitive Ijuin fuse (named after its inventor, Ijuin Goro) at the base as opposed to the tip of a shell that armed itself when the shell was spun by the rifling. These fuses were designed to explode on contact and wreck the upper structures of ships. The Japanese Navy imported cordite from Great Britain as the smokeless propellant for these Shimose shells, so that the smoke off the muzzle would not impede the visibility for the spotters.

In the early 1890s, Vice Admiral Stepan O. Makarov, then the Chief Inspector of Russian naval artillery, proposed a new 12" gun design, and assigned a junior officer, Semyon V. Panpushko, to research the use of picric acid as the explosive in the shell.  However, Panpushko was blown into pieces in an accidental explosion in experiment due to the instability.  Consequently, high explosive shells remained unreachable for the Russian Navy at the time of the Russo-Japanese War, and the navy continued to use the older armour-piercing rounds with guncotton bursting charges and the insensitive delayed-detonation fuses.  They mostly used brown powder or black powder as the propellant, except Sissoi Veliky and the four Borodino-class ships that used smokeless gun powder for the main 12" guns.

As a result, Japanese hits caused more damage to Russian ships than Russian hits on Japanese ships. Shimose blasts often set the superstructures, the paintwork and the large quantities of coal stored on the decks on fire, and the sight of the spotters on Russian ships was hindered by the large amount of smoke generated by the propellant on each uncoordinated firing. Moreover, the sensitivity difference of the fuse caused the Japanese off-the-target shells to explode upon falling on the water creating a much larger splash that sent destabilizing waves to enemy inclinometers, as opposed to the Russian shells not detonating upon falling on the water.  This made an additional difference in the aforementioned shot accuracy by aiding the Japanese spotters to make an easier identification in fall of shot observations.

Gun range and rate of fire 
The Makarov proposal resulted in Model 1895 12-inch gun that extended the range of the previous Model 1886 12-inch Krupp guns (installed on Imperator Nikolai I and Navarin) from 5–6 km to 11 km (at 15-degrees elevation) at the expense of significantly limited amount of explosives that can be contained in the 332kg shell.  Reload time was also improved from 2-4 minutes previously to a rated 90 seconds, but in reality, it was 2.5–3 minutes.  These guns were installed to Sissoi Veliky and the four Borodino-class ships.

The four Japanese battleships, Mikasa, Shikishima, Fuji and Asahi, had the latest Armstrong 12-inch 40-calibre naval gun designed and manufactured by Sir W.G. Armstrong & Company ahead of its acceptance by the Royal Navy in the UK.  These British-built 12" guns had the range of 15,000 yards (14 km) at 15-degrees elevation and the rate of fire at 60 seconds with a heavier 850 Lbs (390 kg) shell.  One of the reasons for the Royal Navy's late adoption of this type of guns was the accidental shell explosions in the barrel Japanese battleships experienced up to the Battle of the Yellow Sea in August 1904, which were diagnosed and almost rectified by the Japanese Navy with the use of aforementioned Ijuin Fuse by the time of this battle.

Aftermath

Battle damage and casualties
Source:

The  and two torpedo boat destroyers Grozniy and Braviy reached Vladivostok. Destroyer Bodriy, ammunition ship Koreya, and ocean tug Svir were interned in Shanghai. Auxiliary Anadyr escaped to Madagascar. Hospital ships Orel and Kostroma were captured by the Japanese. Kostroma was later released.

Russian losses
Total Russian personnel losses were 216 officers and 4,614 men killed; with 278 officers and 5,629 men taken as Prisoners Of War (POW). Interned in neutral ports were 79 officers and 1,783 men.  Escaping to Vladivostok and Diego-Suarez were 62 officers and 1,165 men.  Japanese personnel losses were 117 officers and men killed and 583 officers and men wounded.

The battle was humiliating for Russia, which lost all its battleships and most of its cruisers and destroyers. The battle effectively ended the Russo-Japanese War in Japan's favour. The Russians lost 4,380 killed and 5,917 captured with a further 1,862 interned. Two admirals, Rozhestvensky and Nebogatov, were captured by the Japanese Navy. The second in command of the fleet, Rear Admiral Dmitry Gustavovich von Fölkersahm, after suffering a cerebral hemorrhage on 16 April, died in the night of 24 May 1905 onboard battleship . Vice Admiral Oskar Enqvist fled to Manila onboard cruiser  and was interned by the United States.

Battleships
The Russians lost eleven battleships, including three smaller coastal battleships, either sunk or captured by the Japanese, or scuttled by their crews to prevent capture. Four other battleships, under Rear Admiral Nebogatov, were forced to surrender and would end up as prizes of war.

Cruisers
The cruiser  fought against six Japanese cruisers and survived; however, she was scuttled on 29 May 1905 due to heavy damage. Izumrud ran aground on the Siberian coast. The armed yacht (classified as a cruiser) , alone was able to reach Vladivostok.

Destroyers and auxiliaries
Imperial Russia also lost six of its nine destroyers in the battle, had one interned by the Chinese, and the other two escaped to Vladivostok. They were – Buyniy ("Буйный"), Bistriy ("Быстрый"), Bezuprechniy ("Безупречный"), Gromkiy ("Громкий") and Blestyashchiy ("Блестящий") – sunk on 28 May, Byedoviy ("Бедовый") surrendered that day. Bodriy ("Бодрый") was interned in Shanghai; Grozniy ("Грозный") and Braviy ("Бравый") reached Vladivostok.

Of the auxiliaries, Kamchatka,  and Rus were sunk on 27 May, Irtuish ran aground on 28 May, Koreya and Svir were interned in Shanghai; Anadyr escaped to Madagascar. The hospital ships Orel and Kostroma were captured; Kostroma was released afterwards.

Japanese losses
The Japanese lost three torpedo boats (Nos. 34, 35 and 69). Total casualty of 117 men killed and 500 wounded.

Political consequences
Imperial Russia's prestige was badly damaged and the defeat was a blow to the Romanov dynasty. Most of the Russian fleet was lost; the fast armed yacht Almaz (classified as a cruiser of the 2nd rank) and the destroyers Grozny and Bravy were the only Russian ships to reach Vladivostok. In The Guns of August, the American historian and author Barbara Tuchman argued that because Russia's loss destabilized the balance of power in Europe, it emboldened the Central Powers and contributed to their decision to go to war in 1914.

The battle had a profound cultural and political impact in the world. It was the first defeat of a European power by an Asian nation in the modern era. It also heightened the alarm of "The Yellow Peril" as well as weakening the notion of white superiority that was prevalent in some Western countries. Mahatma Gandhi (India), Mustafa Kemal Atatürk (Turkey), Sun Yat-sen (China) and Jawaharlal Nehru (India) were amongst the future national leaders to celebrate this defeat of a colonial power. The victory established Japan as the sixth greatest naval power while the Russian navy declined to one barely stronger than that of Austria-Hungary.

In The Guinness Book of Decisive Battles, the British historian Geoffrey Regan argues that the victory bolstered Japan's increasingly aggressive political and military establishment. According to Regan, the lopsided Japanese victory at Tsushima:...created a legend that was to haunt Japan's leaders for forty years. A British admiral once said, 'It takes three years to build a ship, but 300 years to build a tradition.' Japan thought that the victory had completed this task in a matter of a few years ... It had all been too easy. Looking at Tōgō's victory over one of the world's great powers convinced some Japanese military men that with more ships, and bigger and better ones, similar victories could be won throughout the Pacific. Perhaps no power could resist the Japanese navy, not even Britain and the United States.

Regan also believes the victory contributed to the Japanese road to later disaster, "because the result was so misleading. Certainly the Japanese navy had performed well, but its opponents had been weak, and it was not invincible... Tōgō's victory [helped] set Japan on a path that would eventually lead her" to the Second World War.

Takano Isoroku, the future Japanese admiral Yamamoto Isoroku who would plan the attack on Pearl Harbor and command the Imperial Japanese Navy through much of the Second World War, served as a junior officer (aboard ) during the battle and was wounded and lost two fingers by an accidental explosion of an 8" shell in a forward gun. Had he lost a third, he would have been medically discharged from the IJN.

Dreadnought arms race

Britain's First Sea Lord, Admiral Jackie Fisher, reasoned that the Japanese victory at Tsushima confirmed the importance of large guns and speed for modern battleships. While Captain William Pakenham of the British Royal Navy, who had been present aboard the Japanese battleship Asahi as an official observer during the Tsushima Battle, "famously remarked...the effect of the fire of every gun is so much less than that of the next larger size, that when 12in guns are firing, shots from 10in pass unnoticed...everything in this war has tended to emphasize the vast importance to a ship, at every stage of her career, of carrying some of the heaviest and furthest shooting guns that can be  got into her."

The battle also accelerated the naval arms race on a geopolitical level; though the Anglo-German naval arms race had begun in 1897, the collapse of Russian naval power in 1905 allowed Britain to send the bulk of its naval forces to other regions, reassured by the naval superiority of its ally Japan in the Far East. In turn, the presence of a larger British fleet in Europe meant that the Germans must build a proportionally larger fleet to maintain the same relative power, in accordance with Tirpitz' fleet in being principle. The Royal Navy, in turn, must increase its fleet size to maintain the relative power as set out by its two-power standard. This positive feedback meant that any external increase in the regional naval power of one side - in this case, the British - would precipitate not just a proportional increase in naval power from the opposing side, but rather a mutual multi-stage build-up in naval power on both sides, before settling to a higher equilibrium. Ultimately, the Germans passed three of its five Fleet Acts after Tsushima within a span of 6 years.

Upon the breakout of World War I, the British and Germans were both aware of the potentially devastating consequences of a naval defeat on the scale of Tsushima. Britain needed its battle fleet to protect its empire, and the trade routes vital to its war effort. Winston Churchill, then First Lord of the Admiralty, described British Admiral John Jellicoe as "the only man who on either side could lose the war in an afternoon." German naval commanders, for their part, understood the importance Kaiser Wilhelm II attached to his navy and the diplomatic prestige it carried. As a result of caution, the British and German fleets met in only one major action in World War I, the indecisive Battle of Jutland.

Timeline

27 May 1905 (JST)
 04:45 The Shinano Maru (Japan) locates the Russian Baltic Fleet and sends a wireless message "Spotted enemy in grid 203" to cruiser , which relays it to the Combined Fleet flagship .
 06:05 The 1st, 2nd and 4th battle divisions of the Japanese Combined Fleet leave mooring in Jinhae (Chinhae, or Chinkai) Bay head East at 15 knots. "Weather is half-cloudy, wind from the South West, wave is still high from the stormy weather in the last two days."
 07:00 Cruiser  relieves Shinano Maru of reporting task and shadows the Baltic Fleet alone, reports "Enemy fleet is in grid 224 (20 n.miles NW of Ukushima Island, Nagasaki) heading North North East".
 10:00 Mikasa sends a wireless message to the Imperial General Headquarters: "Upon receiving its spotting report, Combined Fleet is going into battle with enemy fleet today near Okinoshima Island. Today's weather is fine but waves are high. (Japanese: 本日天気晴朗なれども波高し)".
 10:30 The 5th battle division makes contact with the Baltic Fleet. Stays with the fleet on its right flank.
 11:00 Details of Russian fleet formation is assembled: "Right (East) flank, 1st column Destroyers, 2nd column Knyaz Suvorov, Borodino-class, Borodino-class, Borodino-class, Oslyabya, Sissoi Veliky, Navarin, Nakhimov; 3rd and 4th columns (slightly behind) Transports and Auxiliaries guarded by destroyers; 5th column (Left flank -West) Nikolai I, Admiral-class Coastal Battleship, Admiral-class, Admiral-class, Oleg, Aurora, Donskoi, Monomakh"
 11:30 The 3rd battle division makes contact with the Baltic Fleet. Stays with the fleet on its left flank.
 11:55 Tōgō gathers all hands on Mikasa rear deck, tells the known situation, and says "Accurate aim on all the shots is the foremost and the only wish I have at this moment."
 12:00 Mikasas chief navigation officer records the current coordinates, .
 12:00 Russian fleet starts shifting formations. Kasagi and Itsukushima report all the details in radio telegrams: "Right flank Suvorov and 3 Borodino-class; Left flank , Veliky, Nakhimov, Nikolai I and Admiral-class ships."
 12:30 The 6th battle division (Akitsushima) tails the Baltic Fleet.
 12:38 "Battle stations" ordered on Mikasa.
 13:15 The Japanese main group (Mikasa, Shikishima, Fuji, Asahi, Kasuga, Nisshin and the 2nd battle division in this order) gains visual contact.
 13:39 Mikasa hoists the battle flag, heading SSW approaching the West side of Russian Left flank.
 13:54 Mikasa to the closest Russian ship, Oslyabya: 12,000 yards. Mikasa sends up 'Z' flag, meaning "The Empire's fate depends on the result of this battle, let every man do his utmost duty."
 14:00 Mikasa to Oslyabya: 10,000 yards. Mikasa turns her helm aport and starts a U-turn with the 5 ships following in sequence to head NNE.
 14:03 Shikishima to Oslyabya: 9,000 yards.  As Shikishima starts to turn, Oslyabya opens fire.
 14:07 Fuji to Oslyabya: 8,200 yards. Fuji completes her turn. Knyaz Suvorov and the Russian Baltic Fleet open fire with their main batteries.
 14:10 Asahi to Oslyabya: 7,300 yards. Asahi completes her turn. Mikasa opens fire on Oslyabya with a salvo 6" test shot to establish distance baseline.
 14:12 Kasuga to Oslyabya: 6,500 yards. Mikasa receives her first hit from the Russian guns. Shikishima, Fuji, Asahi, Kasuga and Nisshin open fire on Oslyabya.
 14:14 Nisshin to Oslyabya: 6,000 yards.  Oslyabya loses her front mast and the center stack.
 14:15 Oslyabya catches major fire and slows down.
 14:19 Mikasa to Suvorov: 5,800 yards. Japanese main group begins concentrating their fire on the Russian flagship, which is now leading the Left column heading NNE.
 14:25 Mikasa loses top part of rear mast. Mikasa and her line turns NE and then to East to "cross the T". Russian Left column turns NE and to ESE in response.
 14:43 Knyaz Suvorov is set on fire and fall away from the battle line.
 14:50 Aleksandr turns to the North with Borodino and Oryol following, in an apparent attempt to leave the battle line.
 14:55 Mikasa and the 5 ships make immediate U-turn Left on the spot and heads WNW in reverse order (Nisshin first, Mikasa last).
 15:10 Nisshin to Aleksandr: 4,000 yards. Oslyabya sinks. Knyaz Suvorov attempts to withdraw.
 15:14 Asahi to Aleksandr: 3,000 yards. Aleksandr, apparently giving up fleeing North, turns SE with Borodino and Oryol following.
 15:18 Asahi to Borodino: 2,500 yards.
 15:50 Nisshin and the 5 ships make another immediate U-turn Left, heads NE in normal order (Mikasa first, Nisshin last). Japanese main group loses sight of the Russian main group in the mist.
 17:51 Russian auxiliary cruiser  sunk by the 1st battle division bombardment and a torpedo by battleship Shikishima.
 18:03 Mikasa and the main group finds the remainder of the Russian main group and concentrates fire on the leading Aleksandr III.
 18:16 Aleksandr catches major fire. Japanese main group concentrates fire on Borodino.
 19:03 Imperator Aleksandr III sinks.
 19:04 Huge explosion occurs in Borodinos stern.
 19:20 Knyaz Suvorov sinks.
 19:30 Borodino sinks. Russian repair ship  sinks. Japanese 1st battle division leaves the battle ground.

28 May 1905 (JST)
 05:30 The Japanese Combined Fleet starts assembling a surrounding formation with over 20 capital ships among all the battle divisions.
 09:30 Formation is mostly in place. Mikasa and the 1st battle division approach from the North heading South.
 10:00  turns South and runs at high speed away from the rest of the Russian fleet.
 10:34 Admiral Nebogatov signals "XGE P", which is "Surrendered. Go still (Proceeding slow)" in the International Code of Signals used at the time.
 10:42 Kasuga hoists flag signal "enemy surrendered".
 10:45 Admiral Tōgō accepts the surrender. Cruiser  sunk by the 3rd battle division on its way North to the surrounding formation.
 10:53 Firing stops.

On film
The battle has been the main focus for two historical films in Japan. The first, 1969's Battle of the Japan Sea (日本海大海戦, Nihonkai Daikaisen), directed by Seiji Maruyama, starring Toshiro Mifune as Admiral Tōgō, with music by Masaru Sato and special effects by Eiji Tsuburaya. It was dramatized again in 1983's Battle Anthem (日本海大海戦・海ゆかば, Nihonkai Daikaisen—Umi Yukaba) with Mifune reprising his role.

Another, more recent, depiction is episode 4, season 3 of the 2009–2011 NHK taiga drama series  (lit. "Clouds Above the Slope").

See also

 Order of battle at the Battle of Tsushima
 Imperial Japanese Navy#Naval Buildup and tensions with Russia
 Baltic Fleet#Russo-Japanese War
 Military attachés and observers in the Russo-Japanese War
 Naval history of Japan
 Nicholas II of Russia

Explanatory notes

Citations

General bibliography

Further reading

 
 
 
 
 
 
 
 Lardas, Mark. (2018) Tsushima 1905: Death of a Russian Fleet (Osprey, 2018)  online.
 Nish, Ian, ed. The Russo-Japanese War, 1904-5: A Collection of Eight Volumes. Folkestone, Kent : Global Oriental.  (set) -- OCLC 56955351
 Volume 7:  From Libau to Tsushima: A narrative of the voyage of Admiral Rojdestvensky’s fleet to Eastern seas, including a detailed account of the Dogger Bank Incident, tr. Major Frederick Rowlandson Godfrey (1906) By Eugene S. Politovsky. 
 Volume 8: The Battle of Tsushima Between the Japanese and Russian Fleets, fought on 27 May 1905, tr. Captain Alexander Bertram Lindsay (1912) by Captain Vladimir Semeoff; combined with A Subaltern in Old Russia, tr. Ivor Montagu (1944) by Lieutenant-General A.A. Ignatyev. 
 
 
 
 
 
 Steer, A. P. Lieutenant, Imperial Russian Navy (1913). The "Novik", and the Part She Played in the Russo-Japanese War, 1904. New York: E. P Dutton and Company. Translated by L. A. B. Translator and Editor  of Rasplata

External links

 History.com—This Day In History: The Battle of Tsushima Strait
 Battlefleet 1900—Free naval wargame rules covering pre-dreadnought era, including Russo-Japanese War
 Russojapanesewar.com—complete order of battle of both fleets, Admiral Tōgō's post-battle report and the account of Russian ensign Sememov

1905 in Japan
Battles involving Japan
Battles involving Russia
Conflicts in 1905
May 1905 events
Naval battles of the Russo-Japanese War